Seyyed Dakhil (also Romanized as Seyyed Dakhīl; also known as Saiyid Dukhil and Seyyed Dakhīl-e Yek) is a village in Shahid Modarres Rural District, in the Central District of Shushtar County, Khuzestan Province, Iran. At the 2006 census, its population was 17, in 4 families.

References 

Populated places in Shushtar County